Andrew Wilkins (born 12 April 1938) is a South African former cricketer. He played in eleven first-class matches from 1962/63 to 1966/67.

References

External links
 

1938 births
Living people
South African cricketers
Border cricketers
Eastern Province cricketers
People from Mthatha
Cricketers from the Eastern Cape